Agyneta exigua is a species of sheet weaver found in Cameroon and Nigeria. It was described by Russell-Smith in 1992.

References

exigua
Spiders of Africa
Invertebrates of Cameroon
Invertebrates of West Africa
Endemic fauna of Cameroon
Endemic fauna of Nigeria
Spiders described in 1992